Charles Booth was an English footballer who played in the Football League for Glossop as a right half.

Personal life 
In September 1916, over two years after the outbreak of the First World War, Booth enlisted in the Royal Navy.

Career statistics

References

English footballers
English Football League players
Association football wing halves
People from Glossop
Footballers from Derbyshire
Glossop North End A.F.C. players
Royal Navy personnel of World War I
1897 births
Date of death missing
Royal Navy sailors
Year of death missing